Roger Nordlund (born 19 November 1957) is a politician in Åland, an autonomous and unilingually Swedish territory of Finland. Nordlund is a member of the Åland Centre party and is currently serving as Deputy Premier Government of Åland and Minister of Finance.

Deputy premier (Vice lantråd), Government of Åland 2011-
Speaker, Parliament of Åland 2007- 2011
Premier (lantråd), Government of Åland 1999-2007 
Deputy premier (Vice lantråd), Government of Åland 1995-1999
Minister of education and culture, Government of Åland 1991-1995
Member of the Lagting (Parliament of Åland) 1983-1987
Chairman of the Åland Centre Party 1986–1987, and 1997–2007

See also
Government of Åland
Parliament of Åland

External links
The Åland Parliament

1957 births
Living people
Premiers of Åland
Speakers of the Parliament of Åland
Politicians from Åland